Michael Spencer (November 9, 1919 - April 22, 2016) was a Canadian film producer, most noted for his tenure as the first executive director of the Canadian Film Development Corporation.

Born in London, England, in 1919, Spencer came to Canada in 1939 to visit relatives in British Columbia; however, when the outbreak of World War II complicated his attempt to return home, he moved to Ottawa, Ontario, to take a job with the nascent National Film Board of Canada. Initially a cameraman, he later became a director and producer of NFB documentaries; by the 1960s, he was a key planning executive with the organization.

In 1966, the NFB asked him to establish a new system for funding Canadian feature films; his proposals led to the establishment of the CFDC, now known as Telefilm Canada, and Spencer was named the first director of the organization.

The overall effect of his influence on Canadian film has been debated; most notably, it was at his behest that the government increased the Capital Cost Allowance tax credit from 60 per cent to 100 per cent in 1974, which unwittingly spawned the "tax shelter era" in Canadian film history. He also unsuccessfully advocated for Canadian film to be funded in part by a surtax on box office sales in Canadian movie theatres, and for Canadian content quotas requiring a certain number of theatre screens to be devoted to showing Canadian films.

He left the CFDC in 1978, and subsequently launched Film Finance Canada, a completion bonding firm. In 1980, he served on the feature film jury at the 1980 Cannes Film Festival.

In 2003 he and Suzan Ayscough published the book Hollywood North: Creating the Canadian Motion Picture Industry, a memoir of his career with the NFB and the CFDC.

Awards
In 1989 he was named a Member of the Order of Canada.

In 1992 he was the recipient of a special Genie Award for outstanding contributions to the Canadian film industry at the 13th Genie Awards; he used his speech to criticize the government for doing too little to ensure that Canadian films could actually get widespread distribution in theatres. In 2004, the Canadian Society of Cinematographers named him as the recipient of its Bill Hilson Award for lifetime achievement in Canadian cinema.

Filmography

References

External links

1919 births
2016 deaths
Canadian documentary film producers
Canadian documentary film directors
National Film Board of Canada people
English emigrants to Canada
Canadian Screen Award winners
Canadian film executives
Members of the Order of Canada